Ibrohim Hamroqulov (born 28 July 1982) is an Uzbekistani and Spanish (since 2005) chess Grandmaster (GM) (2006).

Biography
Ibrohim Hamroqulov repeatedly represented Uzbekistan at the World Youth Chess Championship and Asian Youth Chess Championship. In 1998, in Oropesa del Mar he won World Youth Chess Championship in U16 age group.

Ibrohim Hamroqulov other individual successes include:
 2001 - shared 1st place in Oldenburg,
 2002 - shared 1st place in Condom, 1st place in Cáceres,
 2004 - 1st place in Málaga, 1st place in Sant Llorenç des Cardassar,
 2005 - shared 1st places in Málaga and Cáceres,
 2006 - shared 1st place in Condom, shared 1st place in Cáceres,
 2007 - 3rd place in Spanish Chess Championship, shared 1st places in Benidorm and Albacete, 1st place in Salou,
 2008 - shared 2nd place in Seville.

Ibrohim Hamroqulov played for Spain in the Chess Olympiad:
 In 2008, at fourth board in the 38th Chess Olympiad in Dresden (+2, =1, -3).

Ibrohim Hamroqulov played for Spain in the European Team Chess Championship:
 In 2007, at fourth board in the 16th European Team Chess Championship in Heraklion (+1, =4, -1).

In 2000, he was awarded the FIDE International Master (IM) title and received the FIDE Grandmaster (GM) title six years later.

References

External links

Ibrohim Hamroqulov chess games at 365chess.com

1982 births
Living people
Spanish chess players
Uzbekistani chess players
Chess grandmasters
Chess Olympiad competitors
People from Samarqand Region